Nunù Sanchioni (17 September 1908, Cairo – ?) was an Italian operatic singer. She was considered one of the finest coloratura sopranos of her generation and was often compared with Mercedes Capsir and Toti Dal Monte. Her best roles included Rosina in Gioachino Rossini's Il barbiere di Siviglia and Gilda in Giuseppe Verdi's Rigoletto.

Sanchioni was born in Cairo to the family of an Italian consul in Egypt. In her youth she moved to Italy and probably settled in Milan, where she studied singing with Emma Molajoli, the wife of the famous conductor Lorenzo Molajoli. From 1926 to 1932 she appeared with great success in Italian provincial opera houses, but in 1931 and 1932 she sang Rosina in Il barbiere di Siviglia, Gilda in Rigoletto and Hänsel in Engelbert Humperdinck's Hänsel und Gretel at the Teatro San Carlo in Naples. In the same period, and in 1935, she also sang at the Italian Opera in the Netherlands. In 1932, Sanchioni was struck with an illness which led to her withdrawal from the stage for two years. After her recovery in 1934, she was engaged for the season at the Teatro alla Scala in Milan where she sang the role of Adele in Johann Strauss's operetta Die Fledermaus in the production of Max Reinhardt. Towards the end of the 1930s, Sanchioni married a German citizen and moved to Java, where she performed as a concert singer. She returned to Italy in 1946 and kept singing till 1948.

Sanchioni made thirteen recordings for Cigale Records and Columbia Records in the 1930s.

References

External links

, "Una coce poco fa" from Il barbiere di Siviglia

1908 births
Year of death missing
Italian operatic sopranos
20th-century Italian women opera singers
Italian actresses
Italian expatriates in Egypt